Len Silver (born 2 February 1932, east London, England) is a former speedway rider and is former promoter of the Rye House Rockets.

Racing career
Silver stopped racing in 1957 but returned to the Ipswich Witches in 1960 after a layoff due to injury. In 1961 he was transferred to Exeter where he skippered the Exeter Falcons and won the Provincial League Riders' Championship in 1962. Silver made 10 successful defences of the Silver Sash Match Race Championship. In 1964 he transferred to the Hackney Hawks as a rider/promoter but his riding career was cut short by serious injuries after a first bend crash at Hackney shortly after joining.

Promoting career
Silver continued as Hackney's Promoter and Manager until the demise of the Hawks in 1983, and also promoted at Hackney's sister track Rye House. As part of Allied Presentations, he also promoted at the Rayleigh Rockets, Weymouth Wildcats, Crewe Kings, Sunderland Stars and the Reading Racers. He also spent a season as promoter of the Eastbourne Eagles during the 1980s.

He became owner of Rye House Stadium in 2000 and returned to Rye House Speedway as team owner, promoting the Rye House Rockets in the Premier League and the Rye House Cobras in the Conference League. He now co promotes the Kent Kings at Sittingbourne.

He is considered to be one of speedway's most colourful and controversial characters. He was once banned by the Speedway Control Board from "taking any part in a speedway meeting" during the 1976 season after an altercation with a referee.

He has also served as the Team Manager for the England and Great Britain National teams and was the track curator at Wembley stadium for the 1981 World Final.

Has served several terms on the British Speedway Promoters' Association management committee.

In 2021, he announced his retirement from speedway management.

References

External links
Hackney Speedway Website
Rye House Speedway Website
Kent Kings Speedway Website

1932 births
Living people
British speedway riders
English motorcycle racers
Sportspeople from London
Speedway promoters
Hackney Hawks riders
Ipswich Witches riders
Exeter Falcons riders